Ruffinus may refer to:

 Rufinus (Roman governor), a governor of Britannia Superior, a province of Roman Britain
 Saint Ruffin, a mythical Anglo-Saxon martyr